The 2012 USASA Region II National Cup was a qualifying tournament that determined which clubs from the second region of the United States Adult Soccer Association qualified for the first round proper of the 2012 U.S. Open Cup. The Region II National Cup's first round matches took place on 14 April 2012 with the 2nd round match taking place on 15 April 2012. The regional tournament was held in Bensenville, IL. A blind draw held before the tournament determined that the winner of the Cincy Saints/KC Athletics match would receive an automatic berth into the 2012 U.S. Open Cup. The winners of the other two matches would play to determine the 2nd and final berth for Region II.

Qualification

Bracket

See also 
 2012 U.S. Open Cup
 2012 U.S. Open Cup qualification
 United States Adult Soccer Association

References

External links 

2012 U.S. Open Cup
2012
2012